Chinese Massacre Cove is an area along the Snake River in Wallowa County, Oregon, United States. It is located in the Wallowa–Whitman National Forest and the Hells Canyon National Recreation Area, upriver from the Snake's confluence with the Imnaha River. In May 1887, it was the location of the Hells Canyon Massacre, where up to thirty-four Chinese gold miners were ambushed, murdered, and robbed.

History
Chinese Massacre Cove is the location of one of the most brutal injustices against the Chinese immigrants in the Northwest United States. In May 1887, thirty-four Chinese gold miners were ambushed by horse thieves and white schoolboys from Wallowa County. The crime was initially discovered through the appearance of the dead bodies near Lewiston, Idaho with little accuracy of crime specifics. The crime and its details were found later under the direction of Lee Loi of the Sam Yup Company of San Francisco, which was a major employer of Chinese miners who sought the help of Judge Joseph K. Vincent to investigate the situation. Vincent reported his findings to the Chinese consulate in San Francisco which then sought the help from the U.S. State Department. The information given included description of the bodies of the deceased Chinese immigrants, the vague background of the deceased Chinese immigrants, and information on the gang of killers. More than a year after the murders, a trial in Enterprise, Oregon was held in front of a grand jury on September 1, 1888, which accused six men and boys of the nine total of murder. However, none of them were punished for the crime. Over time, the massacre was gradually forgotten.

In 2005, the location was officially renamed from the "Deep Creek Massacre site" to "Chinese Massacre Cove" by the U.S. Board on Geographic Names to commemorate the crime. Each year thereafter, conferences and healing ceremonies were held at the site by local representatives in remembrance the murders of the Chinese immigrants victimized in the attack. In June 2012, a permanent granite memorial was established on the site to recognize these deceased Chinese miners. The text on the memorial in English, Chinese, and Nez Perce (the language of earlier inhabitants of the area) reads, "Chinese Massacre Cove — Site of the 1887 massacre of as many as 34 Chinese gold miners — No one was held accountable."  These words stand to represent the silently oppressed population of Chinese, Native Americans, and other minority races in the area who experienced insufficient justice regarding criminal victimization and injustice against their races.

References

2. "Chinese Massacre at Deep Creek." The Oregon 
Encyclopedia, Portland State University and the Oregon Historical Society, 6 Oct. 2017, oregonencyclopedia.org/articles/chinese_massacre_at_deep_creek/#.Wnn6n7T81n0.

3. Weekly, Northwest Asian. "Community Members Install Memorial at Chinese Massacre Cove." Northwest Asian Weekly, 17 May 2012, nwasianweekly.com/2012/05/community-members-install-memorial-at-chinese-massacre-cove/.

External links
Sept. 1, 1887: A Massacre Of Chinese Miners Produced by Oregon Public Broadcasting
Massacre at Hells Canyon Documentary produced by Oregon Public Broadcasting

Anti-Chinese violence in the United States
Landforms of Wallowa County, Oregon
Valleys of Oregon
Wallowa–Whitman National Forest